Anatoliy Vlasichev (Russian: Анатолий Власичев; born 14 June 1988) is a Kyrgyz professional footballer who plays as a forward for FC Alga Bishkek in the Kyrgyz Premier League.

Career

Club
In September 2016, Vlasichev signed for Oman Club in Oman, returning to Dordoi Bishkek on 19 January 2017.

In July 2017, Vlasichev moved from Dordoi Bishkek to FC Makhtaaral.

On 23 January 2018, Vlasichev scored the only goal in T.C. Sports Club's 1-0 victory over Saif Sporting Club in the first leg of their South Asia Zone 2018 AFC Cup Preliminary round match.

International
He is a member of the Kyrgyzstan national football team from 2011.

Career statistics

International

Statistics accurate as of match played 5 September 2014

References

External links
 

Living people
1988 births
Association football forwards
FC Alay players
FC Alga Bishkek players
FC Dordoi Bishkek players
FC Maktaaral players
FC Okzhetpes players
FC Spartak Semey players
Kyrgyzstani people of Russian descent
Kyrgyzstani footballers
Kyrgyzstani expatriate footballers
Kyrgyzstan international footballers
Oman Club players